Edward Lee Ruth (born October 21, 1990) is an American former professional mixed martial artist and freestyle and folkstyle wrestler. He competed in the Middleweight division of Bellator MMA. As a folkstyle wrestler, he was a three-time NCAA Division I national champion.

Early life
Ruth was born in Harrisburg, Pennsylvania. He wrestled at Susquehanna Township High School, before transferring to Blair Academy in Blairstown, New Jersey for his senior year and graduating in 2009.

Wrestling
In folkstyle wrestling, Ruth competed for Pennsylvania State University from 2010 to 2014.  While there, Ruth was a three-time NCAA Division I national champion. 
In freestyle wrestling, Ruth represented the United States at the 2014 World Wrestling Championships and the 2015 Wrestling World Cup.

In July 2021, Ruth joined the University of Illinois wrestling as an assistant coach.

Mixed martial arts career
In December 2014, Ruth trained with mixed martial arts (MMA) fighter Jon Jones. While living in State College, PA, Ruth trained at Central PA Mixed Martial Arts with head instructor Ryan Gruhn.

Bellator MMA
He signed with Bellator MMA in May 2015. Due to his focus on competing in the 2016 Summer Olympics, Ruth declared that it would "be a little while" before his MMA debut.

Ruth made his professional MMA debut in November 2016 on the undercard of Bellator 163 against Dustin Collins-Miles, fighting in the middleweight division. He won the fight via TKO in the first round.'

In his second professional MMA bout, Ruth faced Emanuele Palombi at Bellator 168 on December 10, 2016. He again won via TKO in the first round.

Ruth was expected to face Aaron Goodwine at Bellator 178 on April 21, 2017 but the bout did not materialize. Ruth instead fought and defeated David Mundell.

Ruth faced UFC veteran Chris Dempsey on November 3, 2017 at Bellator 186. He won the fight via knockout in the second round.

Ruth was originally scheduled to make his welterweight debut and face Lazslo Furko of Hungary, but Furko pulled out due to injury.  Ruth then faced Ion Pascu of Romania, who took the fight on two weeks notice at Bellator 196 held in Budapest, Hungary.  This fight was agreed at a catchweight of 175 lbs.  He won the fight by unanimous decision after taking Pascu down numerous times and landing heavy ground and pound.

Ruth made his welterweight debut against Andy Murad at Bellator 201 in Temecula, California. He won the fight by TKO in round two.

Ruth next entered the Bellator Welterweight Grand Prix. He faced Neiman Gracie in the quarterfinals at Bellator 213 on December 15, 2018. He lost the fight via rear-naked choke submission in the fourth round. After the loss, Ruth decided to leave Alliance MMA and join American Kickboxing Academy.

Ruth faced Kiichi Kunimoto at Bellator 224 on July 12, 2019 and won the fight via TKO in the second round.

On August 15, 2019, it was announced that Ruth had signed an exclusive multi-fight, multi-year contract extension with Bellator. As the first fight of his new contract, Ruth faced Jason Jackson at Bellator 231 on October 25, 2019. He won the back-and-forth fight by split decision. 4 out of 6 media scores gave it to Jackson.

Ruth faced Yaroslav Amosov in the main event of Bellator 239, on February 21, 2020. He lost the fight via unanimous decision.

Ruth faced Taylor Johnson at Bellator 245 on September 11, 2020. He lost the bout due to an inverted heel hook submission early in the first round.

In July 2021, Ruth retired from MMA and took a job as assistant coach with the University of Illinois wrestling program, joining head coach Mike Poeta in his first year at the helm of the program.

Championships and accomplishments

Freestyle wrestling 
 United World Wrestling
 2015 Henri Deglane Challenge Silver Medalist
 2015 Bill Farrell International Open Gold Medalist
 2014 Heydar Aliyev Memorial Golden Grand Prix Bronze Medalist
 USA Wrestling
 2015 U.S World Team Trials Silver Medalist
 2015 U.S ASICS National Championships Bronze Medalist
 2014 U.S World Team Member
 2014 U.S Open Bronze Medalist
 2013 U.S University National Championships Gold Medalist

Folkstyle wrestling 
 National Collegiate Athletic Association
NCAA Division I All-American out of Pennsylvania State University (2011, 2012, 2013, 2014)
NCAA Division I 174 lb - Third Place out of Pennsylvania State University (2011)
NCAA Division I 174 lb National Championship out of Pennsylvania State University (2012)
NCAA Division I 184 lb National Championship out of Pennsylvania State University (2013)
NCAA Division I 184 lb National Championship out of Pennsylvania State University (2014)
 Big Ten Conference
 Big Ten 174 lb National Championship out of Pennsylvania State University (2011)
 Big Ten 174 lb National Championship out of Pennsylvania State University (2012)
 Big Ten 184 lb National Championship out of Pennsylvania State University (2013)
 Big Ten 184 lb National Championship out of Pennsylvania State University (2014)

Mixed martial arts record

 
|-
|Loss
|align=center|8–3
|Taylor Johnson
|Submission (inverted heel hook)
|Bellator 245
|
|align=center| 1
|align=center| 0:59
|Uncasville, Connecticut, United States
|
|-
|Loss
|align=center|8–2
|Yaroslav Amosov
|Decision (unanimous)
|Bellator 239
|
|align=center| 3
|align=center| 5:00
|Thackerville, Oklahoma, United States
|
|-
|Win
|align=center|8–1
|Jason Jackson
|Decision (split)
|Bellator 231
|
|align=center| 3
|align=center| 5:00
|Uncasville, Connecticut, United States
|
|-
|Win
|align=center|7–1
|Kiichi Kunimoto 
|TKO (punches)
|Bellator 224
|
|align=center|2
|align=center|3:49
|Thackerville, Oklahoma, United States
|
|-
|Loss
|align=center|6–1
|Neiman Gracie
|Submission (rear-naked choke)
|Bellator 213
|
|align=center|4
|align=center|2:17
|Honolulu, Hawaii, United States
|
|-
|Win
|align=center|6–0
|Andy Murad
|TKO (punches)
|Bellator 201
|
|align=center|2
|align=center|4:59
|Temecula, California, United States
| 
|-
|Win
|align=center|5–0
|Ion Pascu
|Decision (unanimous)
|Bellator 196
|
|align=center|3
|align=center|5:00
|Budapest, Hungary
| 
|-
|Win
|align=center|4–0
|Chris Dempsey
|KO (punch)
|Bellator 186
|
|align=center|2
|align=center|0:27
|University Park, Pennsylvania, United States
|
|-
|Win
|align=center|3–0
|David Mundell
|TKO (knee to the body)
|Bellator 178
|
|align=center|2
|align=center|3:13
|Uncasville, Connecticut, United States
|
|-
|Win
|align=center|2–0
|Emanuele Palombi
|TKO (punches)
|Bellator 168
|
|align=center|1
|align=center|1:33
|Florence, Italy
|
|-
|Win
|align=center|1–0
|Dustin Collins-Miles
|TKO (punches)
|Bellator 163
|
|align=center|1
|align=center|3:19
|Uncasville, Connecticut, United States
|

NCAA record

! colspan="8"| NCAA Championships Matches
|-
!  Res.
!  Record
!  Opponent
!  Score
!  Date
!  Event
|-
! style=background:white colspan=6 |2014 NCAA Championships  at 184 lbs
|-
|Win
|20-1
|align=left|Jimmy Sheptock
|style="font-size:88%"|7-2
|style="font-size:88%" rowspan=5|March 20–22, 2014
|style="font-size:88%" rowspan=5|2014 NCAA Division I Wrestling Championships
|-
|Win
|19-1
|align=left|Gabe Dean
|style="font-size:88%"|5-3
|-
|Win
|18-1
|align=left|Kevin Steinhaus
|style="font-size:88%"|MD 10-2
|-
|Win
|17-1
|align=left|Lazarus Reyes
|style="font-size:88%"|TF 15-0
|-
|Win
|16-1
|align=left|Jackson Hein
|style="font-size:88%"|Fall
|-
! style=background:white colspan=6 |2013 NCAA Championships  at 184 lbs
|-
|Win
|15-1
|align=left|Robert Hamlin
|style="font-size:88%"|MD 12-4
|style="font-size:88%" rowspan=5|March 21–23, 2013
|style="font-size:88%" rowspan=5|2013 NCAA Division I Wrestling Championships
|-
|Win
|14-1
|align=left|Steve Bosak
|style="font-size:88%"|4-1
|-
|Win
|13-1
|align=left|Josh Ihnen
|style="font-size:88%"|MD 11-1
|-
|Win
|12-1
|align=left|Kevin Radford
|style="font-size:88%"|Fall
|-
|Win
|11-1
|align=left|Fred Garcia
|style="font-size:88%"|Fall
|-
! style=background:white colspan=6 |2012 NCAA Championships  at 174 lbs
|-
|Win
|10-1
|align=left|Nick Amuchastegui
|style="font-size:88%"|MD 13-2
|style="font-size:88%" rowspan=5|March 15–17, 2012
|style="font-size:88%" rowspan=5|2012 NCAA Division I Wrestling Championships
|-
|Win
|9-1
|align=left|Logan Storley
|style="font-size:88%"|TF 17-1
|-
|Win
|8-1
|align=left|Nick Heflin
|style="font-size:88%"|11-4
|-
|Win
|7-1
|align=left|Dorian Henderson
|style="font-size:88%"|Fall
|-
|Win
|6-1
|align=left|Jim Resnick
|style="font-size:88%"|Fall
|-
! style=background:white colspan=6 |2011 NCAA Championships  at 174 lbs
|-
|Win
|5-1
|align=left|Chris Henrich
|style="font-size:88%"|7-2
|style="font-size:88%" rowspan=6|March 17–19, 2011
|style="font-size:88%" rowspan=6|2011 NCAA Division I Wrestling Championships
|-
|Win
|4-1
|align=left|Ben Bennett
|style="font-size:88%"|Fall
|-
|Win
|3-1
|align=left|Luke Manuel
|style="font-size:88%"|7-6
|-
|Lose
|2-1
|align=left|Nick Amuchastegui
|style="font-size:88%"|WDF
|-
|Win
|2-0
|align=left|Scott Glasser
|style="font-size:88%"|5-3
|-
|Win
|1-0
|align=left|Royal Bettrager
|style="font-size:88%"|Fall
|-

Freestyle record

|-
!  Res.
!  Record
!  Opponent
!  Score
!  Date
!  Event
!  Location
|-
! style=background:white colspan=7 |
|-
|Loss
|42-14
|align=left| Clayton Foster
|style="font-size:88%"|8-15
|style="font-size:88%" rowspan=5|December 18, 2015
|style="font-size:88%" rowspan=5|2015 US Senior National Championships
|style="text-align:left;font-size:88%;" rowspan=5| Las Vegas, Nevada
|-
|Win
|42-13
|align=left| Ethen Lofthouse
|style="font-size:88%"|TF 10-0
|-
|Loss
|41-13
|align=left| David Taylor
|style="font-size:88%"|TF 0-13
|-
|Win
|41-12
|align=left| Anthony Jones
|style="font-size:88%"|Fall
|-
|Win
|40-12
|align=left| Frank Richmond
|style="font-size:88%"|TF 11-0
|-
! style=background:white colspan=7 |
|-
|Loss
|39-12
|align=left| Gheorghiță Ștefan
|style="font-size:88%"|TF 0-10
|style="font-size:88%" rowspan=3|November 27, 2015
|style="font-size:88%" rowspan=3|2015 Henri Deglane Challenge
|style="text-align:left;font-size:88%;" rowspan=3| Nice, France
|-
|Win
|39-11
|align=left| Armin Rezazadehbabaei
|style="font-size:88%"|TF 10-0
|-
|Win
|38-11
|align=left| Giorgi Tigishvili
|style="font-size:88%"|9-1
|-
! style=background:white colspan=7 |
|-
|Win
|37-11
|align=left| Jon Reader
|style="font-size:88%"|TF 13-0
|style="font-size:88%" rowspan=4|November 7, 2015
|style="font-size:88%" rowspan=4|2015 Bill Farrell International Open
|style="text-align:left;font-size:88%;" rowspan=4| New York City, New York
|-
|Win
|36-11
|align=left| Richard Perry
|style="font-size:88%"|5-4
|-
|Win
|35-11
|align=left| Robert Hamlin
|style="font-size:88%"|TF 14-3
|-
|Win
|34-11
|align=left| Timmy McCall
|style="font-size:88%"|TF 12-2
|-
! style=background:white colspan=7 |
|-
|Loss
|33-11
|align=left| Dauren Kurugliev
|style="font-size:88%"|Fall
|style="font-size:88%" rowspan=2|July 24, 2015
|style="font-size:88%" rowspan=2|2015 Wrestling World Cup
|style="text-align:left;font-size:88%;" rowspan=2| Baku, Azerbaijan
|-
|Win
|33-10
|align=left| Reineris Salas
|style="font-size:88%"|22-13
|-
! style=background:white colspan=7 | 
|-
|Loss
|32-10
|align=left| Jake Herbert
|style="font-size:88%"|2-10
|style="font-size:88%" rowspan=5|July 13, 2015
|style="font-size:88%" rowspan=2|2015 US World Team Trials
|style="text-align:left;font-size:88%;" rowspan=5|
 Madison, Wisconsin
|-
|Loss
|32-9
|align=left| Jake Herbert
|style="font-size:88%"|TF 3-13
|-
|Win
|32-8
|align=left| Keith Gavin
|style="font-size:88%"|TF 12-2
|style="font-size:88%" rowspan=3|2015 US World Team Trials Challenge Tournament
|-
|Win
|31-8
|align=left| Jon Reader
|style="font-size:88%"|24-18
|-
|Win
|30-8
|align=left| Phillip Keddy
|style="font-size:88%"|TF 14-3
|-
! style=background:white colspan=7 |
|-
|Win
|29-8
|align=left |  Deron Winn
|style="font-size:88%"|TF 12-2
|style="font-size:88%" rowspan=6|May 7, 2015
|style="font-size:88%" rowspan=6|2015 Las Vegas/ASICS US Senior National Championships
|style="text-align:left;font-size:88%;" rowspan=6| Las Vegas, Nevada
|-
|Win
|28-8
|align=left| Jon Reader
|style="font-size:88%"|TF 10-0
|-
|Loss
|27-8
|align=left| Jake Herbert
|style="font-size:88%"|11-13
|-
|Win
|27-7
|align=left| Ryan Loder
|style="font-size:88%"|TF 10-0
|-
|Win
|26-7
|align=left| Austin Morehead 
|style="font-size:88%"|TF 13-2
|-
|Win
|25-7
|align=left| Adam Fierro
|style="font-size:88%"|TF 10-0
|-
! style=background:white colspan=7 |
|-
|Loss
|24-7
|align=left |  Mohammad Hossein Mohammadian
|style="font-size:88%"|4-7
|style="font-size:88%" rowspan=2|September 8, 2014
|style="font-size:88%" rowspan=2|2014 World Wrestling Championships
|style="text-align:left;font-size:88%;" rowspan=2| Tashkent, Uzbekistan
|-
|Win
|24-6
|align=left| Yusup Melejayev
|style="font-size:88%"|TF 12-2
|-
! style=background:white colspan=7 |
|-
|Win
|23-6
|align=left |  Taimuraz Friev
|style="font-size:88%"|5-0
|style="font-size:88%" rowspan=4|July 24, 2014
|style="font-size:88%" rowspan=4|2014 Heydar Aliyev Memorial Golden Grand Prix
|style="text-align:left;font-size:88%;" rowspan=4| Baku, Azerbaijan
|-
|Loss
|22-6
|align=left| Shamil Kudiyamagomedov
|style="font-size:88%"|2-3
|-
|Win
|22-5
|align=left| Magomiedgadży Chatijew
|style="font-size:88%"|4-1
|-
|Win
|21-5
|align=left| Armands Zvirbulis
|style="font-size:88%"|TF 18-4
|-
! style=background:white colspan=7 | 
|-
|Win
|20-5
|align=left| Keith Gavin
|style="font-size:88%"|11-7
|style="font-size:88%" rowspan=6|June 1, 2014
|style="font-size:88%" rowspan=3|2014 US World Team Trials
|style="text-align:left;font-size:88%;" rowspan=6|
 Madison, Wisconsin
|-
|Win
|19-5
|align=left| Keith Gavin
|style="font-size:88%"|Fall
|-
|Loss
|18-5
|align=left| Keith Gavin
|style="font-size:88%"|5-7
|-
|Win
|18-4
|align=left| Clayton Foster
|style="font-size:88%"|7-3
|style="font-size:88%" rowspan=3|2014 US World Team Trials Challenge Tournament
|-
|Win
|17-4
|align=left| Phillip Keddy
|style="font-size:88%"|TF 14-4
|-
|Win
|16-4
|align=left| Robert Hamlin
|style="font-size:88%"|TF 13-3
|-
! style=background:white colspan=7 |
|-
|Win
|15-4
|align=left |  Jon Reader
|style="font-size:88%"|12-11
|style="font-size:88%" rowspan=6|April 18, 2014
|style="font-size:88%" rowspan=6|2014 U.S Open Wrestling Championships
|style="text-align:left;font-size:88%;" rowspan=6| Las Vegas, Nevada
|-
|Win
|14-4
|align=left |  Robert Hamlin
|style="font-size:88%"|6-2
|-
|Loss
|13-4
|align=left |  Clayton Foster
|style="font-size:88%"|13-14
|-
|Win
|13-3
|align=left |  Phillip Keddy
|style="font-size:88%"|14-10
|-
|Win
|12-3
|align=left |  Richard Perry
|style="font-size:88%"|TF 11-1
|-
|Win
|11-3
|align=left| Kane Hobbs
|style="font-size:88%"|TF 10-0
|-
! style=background:white colspan=7 |
|-
|Loss
|10-3
|align=left |Mohammad Hossein Mohammadian
|style="font-size:88%"|TF 0-10
|style="font-size:88%"|July 11, 2013
|style="font-size:88%"|2013 Summer Universiade
|style="font-size:88%"| Tashkent, Uzbekistan
|-
! style=background:white colspan=7 |
|-
|Win
|10-2
|align=left |  Cameron Simaz
|style="font-size:88%"|TF 10-0
|style="font-size:88%" rowspan=7|May 25, 2013
|style="font-size:88%" rowspan=7|2013 US University National Championships
|style="text-align:left;font-size:88%;" rowspan=7| Akron, Ohio
|-
|Win
|9-2
|align=left |  Cameron Simaz
|style="font-size:88%"|6-4
|-
|Win
|8-2
|align=left |  Max Thomusseit
|style="font-size:88%"|9-8
|-
|Win
|7-2
|align=left |  Kenneth Courts
|style="font-size:88%"|14-9
|-
|Win
|6-2
|align=left |  Michael Dessino
|style="font-size:88%"|TF 10-0
|-
|Win
|5-2
|align=left |  David Chenevey
|style="font-size:88%"|TF 10-0
|-
|Win
|4-2
|align=left| Nolan Boyd
|style="font-size:88%"|TF 17-7
|-
! style=background:white colspan=7 |
|-
|Loss
|3-2
|align=left |  Jon Reader
|style="font-size:88%"|7-3
|style="font-size:88%" rowspan=5|April 18, 2013
|style="font-size:88%" rowspan=5|2013 US Open Wrestling Championships
|style="text-align:left;font-size:88%;" rowspan=5| Las Vegas, Nevada
|-
|Win
|3-1
|align=left |  Austin Trotman
|style="font-size:88%"|7-3
|-
|Loss
|2-1
|align=left |  Clayton Foster
|style="font-size:88%"|1-7
|-
|Win
|2-0
|align=left |  Enock Francois
|style="font-size:88%"|5-0
|-
|Win
|1-0
|align=left| Daniel Bedoy
|style="font-size:88%"|10-4
|-

Submission grappling record

References

External links

Official website
Sherdog Profile
Official Ed Ruth Tee KO Page

1990 births
Sportspeople from Harrisburg, Pennsylvania
Living people
African-American sport wrestlers
American male sport wrestlers
Blair Academy alumni
Pennsylvania State University alumni
American male mixed martial artists
African-American mixed martial artists
Mixed martial artists utilizing collegiate wrestling
Mixed martial artists utilizing freestyle wrestling
Mixed martial artists utilizing Brazilian jiu-jitsu
Bellator male fighters
21st-century African-American sportspeople
American practitioners of Brazilian jiu-jitsu